Point Pleasant Beach is a borough in Ocean County, New Jersey, United States. As of the 2010 United States Census, the borough's population was 4,665, reflecting a decline of 649 (−12.2%) from the 5,314 counted in the 2000 Census, which had in turn increased by 202 (+4.0%) from the 5,112 counted in the 1990 Census.

Point Pleasant Beach was incorporated as a borough by an act of the New Jersey Legislature on May 18, 1886, from portions of Brick Township, subject to the results of a referendum passed the previous day.

The borough is situated on the Barnegat Peninsula, a long, narrow barrier peninsula that divides the Barnegat Bay from the Atlantic Ocean at the Manasquan Inlet, and the borough derives its name from this location. Point Pleasant Beach is also the northern terminus of the East Coast's Intracoastal Waterway. It is near  Point Pleasant borough, a municipality independent of Point Pleasant Beach.

The borough's boardwalk is approximately one mile long, spanning the coastline from the Manasquan Inlet at the north to New Jersey Avenue in the south. The central third of the boardwalk is largely amusement rides, the Jenkinson's Aquarium, the Jenkinsons Arcades, pizza joints, ice cream parlors, games-of-chance and miniature golf courses. There are fees of up to $10 per person age 12 or over to access the various beaches, as well as parking fees of up to $2.50 per hour or more.

It was ranked the eighth-best beach in New Jersey in the 2008 Top 10 Beaches Contest sponsored by the New Jersey Marine Sciences Consortium.

History
The area that includes Point Pleasant Beach was first occupied by the Lenape Native Americans. On September 2, 1609, Henry Hudson and the crew of his ship, Half Moon, noticed the area on their way north to explore the Hudson River. Crew member Robert Juet noted in his journal, "This is a very good Land to fall with and a pleasant Land to see." The first European settlers were fisherman and farmers who first arrived in the 18th century. Summer tourism began in the early 19th century when Quaker Thomas Cook Jr. opened his farmhouse on the site of the current Antrim Elementary School to boarders, which began the trend that transformed the area into an oceanfront haven for visitors, a trend further established in the 1870 by Captain John Arnold, who built a roadway to the ocean, now known as Arnold Avenue. In 1875, he built the first bridge over the Manasquan River, linking the town to Brielle. He later convinced the Central Jersey Railroad to extend its service to Point Pleasant Beach, which it did beginning on July 3, 1880.

The Borough of Point Pleasant Beach was established on June 2, 1886.

The 1870s was an era of major tourism expansion, driven by developers who subdivided old farms for vacation home lots. Captain Arnold devised Arnold City between Central and what was to become Arnold Avenue. In 1877, the Point Pleasant Land Company bought the old Forman Farm,  on what is now Route 35 South, between Forman and Elizabeth Avenues and began selling lots. In 1878, it built the four-story, 200-guest Resort House, the largest building in town. It also began a horse-drawn trolley service to attract tourists. Other hotels were built before the turn-of-the-20th century, including the largest, the Leighton, as well as the Beacon, and Zimmerman's, though many of these, including the Resort House, burnt down, succumbed to changing tastes, or were dismantled for wood during World War II. Initially, visitors focused their attention on the Manasquan River, cedar groves and farmhouses, but their interest in the ocean led to development on the waterfront, beginning with the first beachfront pavilion on Atlantic Avenue in 1880. Ten years later, the first flimsy, portable boardwalk was built, but it washed away within two years.

The original amusement area was Clark's Landing, which opened on the Manasquan River in 1892. In 1897, the decision for privately owned beaches in Point Pleasant Beach was made when, as noted in the Council minutes of August 16, "Ownership of the Beach turned down by the Council because of the extreme cost to the Borough for maintenance." In 1915, the first permanent boardwalk was built between Philadelphia and Central Avenues, and eventually expanded along the entire length of Point Pleasant Beach, but shortened to its present length by a September 1938 hurricane that destroyed its southern portion. It evolved from a mere promenade for strolling to a more active amusement area, beginning with Charles Jenkinson's construction in the 1920s of Jenkinson's Pavilion and Swimming Pool. The boardwalk pavilion became the center of nightlife, featuring sophisticated dancing, well-known big bands, and occasional live nationally broadcast radio. Today it features a number of amusement rides, video arcades, and diverse cuisine, ranging from sausage sandwiches to sushi. Point Pleasant Beach hosts an annual Seafood Festival in September.

On February 12, 1900, the steel-hulled, Scottish barque, County of Edinburgh was blown ashore at high tide and became stranded. The event became national news when it was extensively reported in The New York Times, illustrated by a high quality photograph that became the resource for a famous painting by Antonio Jacobsen. The undamaged vessel was successfully re-floated on the spring tide of February 14 and continued on her voyage from Cape Town to New York.

In October 2012, Point Pleasant Beach and numerous other Jersey Shore communities, such as Seaside Heights and Long Beach Island, were devastated by Hurricane Sandy. Nearly  of the borough's boardwalk was destroyed, with the cost of repairs estimated as up to $2 million.

After Hurricane Sandy a seawall was constructed to protect the area from future storms. In addition, the borough required residents who wished to rebuild their homes to elevate them on pilings above the height of Sandy's storm surge.

Geography

According to the United States Census Bureau, the borough had a total area of 1.74 square miles (4.50 km2), including 1.42 square miles (3.68 km2) of land and 0.32 square miles (0.82 km2) of water (18.22%).

Unincorporated communities, localities and place names located partially or completely within the township include Clark's Landing, Lovelandtown and Sunshine Harbor.

The borough borders the municipalities of Bay Head and Point Pleasant in Ocean County; and both Brielle and Manasquan in Monmouth County.

Demographics

Census 2010

The Census Bureau's 2006–2010 American Community Survey showed that (in 2010 inflation-adjusted dollars) median household income was $57,792 (with a margin of error of +/− $6,541) and the median family income was $65,402 (+/− $16,995). Males had a median income of $54,327 (+/− $12,359) versus $39,076 (+/− $6,800) for females. The per capita income for the borough was $39,250 (+/− $5,121). About 5.8% of families and 8.4% of the population were below the poverty line, including 21.0% of those under age 18 and 3.4% of those age 65 or over.

Census 2000
As of the 2000 United States Census there were 5,314 people, 2,317 households, and 1,316 families residing in the borough. The racial makeup of the borough was 95.94% White, 0.53% African American, 0.34% Native American, 1.02% Asian, 0.02% Pacific Islander, 1.47% from other races, and 0.70% from two or more races. Hispanic or Latino of any race were 4.40% of the population.

There were 2,317 households, out of which 22.9% had children under the age of 18 living with them, 43.3% were married couples living together, 9.6% had a female householder with no husband present, and 43.2% were non-families. 36.3% of all households were made up of individuals, and 14.4% had someone living alone who was 65 years of age or older. The average household size was 2.25 and the average family size was 2.96.

In the borough the population was spread out, with 19.2% under the age of 18, 6.5% from 18 to 24, 28.6% from 25 to 44, 26.6% from 45 to 64, and 19.0% who were 65 years of age or older. The median age was 43 years. For every 100 females, there were 101.6 males. For every 100 females age 18 and over, there were 99.9 males.

The median income for a household in the borough was $51,105, and the median income for a family was $61,250. Males had a median income of $40,507 versus $37,500 for females. The per capita income for the borough was $27,853. About 5.0% of families and 6.1% of the population were below the poverty line, including 2.9% of those under age 18 and 6.8% of those age 65 or over.

Government

Local government

Point Pleasant Beach is governed under the Borough form of New Jersey municipal government, one of 218 municipalities (of the 564) statewide, making it the most common form of government in New Jersey. The governing body is comprised of the Mayor and the Borough Council, with all positions elected at-large on a partisan basis as part of the November general election. The Mayor is elected directly by the voters to a four-year term of office. The Borough Council is comprised of six members elected to serve three-year terms on a staggered basis, with two seats coming up for election each year in a three-year cycle. The Borough form of government used by Point Pleasant Beach is a "weak mayor / strong council" government in which council members act as the legislative body with the mayor presiding at meetings and voting only in the event of a tie. The mayor can veto ordinances subject to an override by a two-thirds majority vote of the council. The mayor makes committee and liaison assignments for council members, and most appointments are made by the mayor with the advice and consent of the council.

, the Mayor of Point Pleasant Beach is Republican Paul M. Kanitra, whose term of office ends December 31, 2023. Members of the Borough Council are Council President Douglas Vitale (R, 2022), Caryn S. Byrnes (R, 2023), Rose Crowley (R, 2024), Thomas H. Migut (R, 2023), Michael Ramos (R, 2024) and Arlene Testa (R, 2022).

In February 2020, the Borough Council selected Caryn S. Byrnes to fill the seat expiring in December 2020 that became vacant following the resignation of Paul Kanitra to take office as mayor.

Federal, state and county representation
Point Pleasant Beach is located in the 4th Congressional District and is part of New Jersey's 10th state legislative district.

 

Ocean County is governed by a Board of County Commissioners comprised of five members who are elected on an at-large basis in partisan elections and serving staggered three-year terms of office, with either one or two seats coming up for election each year as part of the November general election. At an annual reorganization held in the beginning of January, the board chooses a Director and a Deputy Director from among its members. , Ocean County's Commissioners (with party affiliation, term-end year and residence) are:

Commissioner Director John P. Kelly (R, 2022, Eagleswood Township),
Commissioner Deputy Director Virginia E. Haines (R, 2022, Toms River),
Barbara Jo Crea (R, 2024, Little Egg Harbor Township)
Gary Quinn (R, 2024, Lacey Township) and
Joseph H. Vicari (R, 2023, Toms River). Constitutional officers elected on a countywide basis are 
County Clerk Scott M. Colabella (R, 2025, Barnegat Light),
Sheriff Michael G. Mastronardy (R, 2022; Toms River) and
Surrogate Jeffrey Moran (R, 2023, Beachwood).

Politics
As of March 23, 2011, there were a total of 3,385 registered voters in Point Pleasant Beach, of which 623 (18.4%) were registered as Democrats, 1,295 (38.3%) were registered as Republicans and 1,465 (43.3%) were registered as Unaffiliated. There were 2 voters registered as either Libertarians or Greens. Among the borough's 2010 Census population, 72.6% (vs. 63.2% in Ocean County) were registered to vote, including 89.5% of those ages 18 and over (vs. 82.6% countywide).

In the 2012 presidential election, Republican Mitt Romney received 60.1% of the vote (1,373 cast), ahead of Democrat Barack Obama with 39.0% (891 votes), and other candidates with 0.9% (20 votes), among the 2,299 ballots cast by the borough's 3,559 registered voters (15 ballots were spoiled), for a turnout of 64.6%. In the 2008 presidential election, Republican John McCain received 58.1% of the vote (1,486 cast), ahead of Democrat Barack Obama with 40.1% (1,026 votes) and other candidates with 1.3% (34 votes), among the 2,557 ballots cast by the borough's 3,533 registered voters, for a turnout of 72.4%. In the 2004 presidential election, Republican George W. Bush received 59.2% of the vote (1,561 ballots cast), outpolling Democrat John Kerry with 39.2% (1,035 votes) and other candidates with 0.9% (32 votes), among the 2,639 ballots cast by the borough's 3,647 registered voters, for a turnout percentage of 72.4.

In the 2013 gubernatorial election, Republican Chris Christie received 74.5% of the vote (1,332 cast), ahead of Democrat Barbara Buono with 23.6% (421 votes), and other candidates with 1.9% (34 votes), among the 1,843 ballots cast by the borough's 3,502 registered voters (56 ballots were spoiled), for a turnout of 52.6%. In the 2009 gubernatorial election, Republican Chris Christie received 65.1% of the vote (1,280 ballots cast), ahead of  Democrat Jon Corzine with 27.8% (546 votes), Independent Chris Daggett with 5.3% (105 votes) and other candidates with 0.5% (10 votes), among the 1,966 ballots cast by the borough's 3,425 registered voters, yielding a 57.4% turnout.

Education
The Point Pleasant Beach School District serves students in pre-kindergarten through twelfth grade. As of the 2018–19 school year, the district, comprised of two schools, had an enrollment of 763 students and 78.3 classroom teachers (on an FTE basis), for a student–teacher ratio of 9.7:1. Schools in the district (with 2018–19 enrollment data from the National Center for Education Statistics) are 
G. Harold Antrim Elementary School 384 students in grades Pre-K–8 and 
Point Pleasant Beach High School 367 students in grades 9–12.

In addition to the students of Point Pleasant Beach, the district also serves the students of Bay Head and Lavallette for grades 9–12 and those from Mantoloking for K–12, as part of sending/receiving relationships. Some outside students attend the district's schools on a tuition basis.

Transportation

Roads and highways

New Jersey Route 35 is the main highway serving Point Pleasant Beach. The highway traverses the borough north to south, connecting Point Pleasant Beach to Bay Head and Brielle. New Jersey Route 88 has its eastern terminus at Route 35 along the southwest edge of Point Pleasant Beach, from which point it heads west through Point Pleasant and onward to Lakewood.

Public transportation

NJ Transit trains stop at the Point Pleasant Beach station on Arnold Avenue with service on the North Jersey Coast Line north to Penn Station Newark, Hoboken Terminal, and Penn Station New York in Midtown Manhattan.

NJ Transit provides bus service between the borough and Philadelphia on the 317 route along with local service on the 830 route.

Ocean Ride local service is provided on the OC3A Brick—Point Pleasant and the OC4 Lakewood—Brick Link routes.

In popular culture
Composer Edward Manukyan, who lived in Point Pleasant Beach briefly in 2002, wrote the song "Point Pleasant Beach" about the borough.

Climate
According to the Köppen climate classification system, Point Pleasant Beach, New Jersey has a humid subtropical climate (Cfa). Cfa climates are characterized by all months having an average mean temperature > 32.0 °F (> 0.0 °C), at least four months with an average mean temperature ≥ 50.0 °F (≥ 10.0 °C), at least one month with an average mean temperature ≥ 71.6 °F (≥ 22.0 °C) and no significant precipitation difference between seasons. During the summer months at Point Pleasant Beach, a cooling afternoon  sea breeze is present on most days, but episodes of extreme heat and humidity can occur with heat index values ≥ 95 °F (≥ 35 °C). On average, the wettest month of the year is July which corresponds with the annual peak in thunderstorm activity. During the winter months, episodes of extreme cold and wind can occur with wind chill values < 0 °F (< −18 °C). The plant hardiness zone at Point Pleasant Beach is 7a with an average annual extreme minimum air temperature of 3.7 °F (−15.7 °C).

Ecology
According to the A. W. Kuchler U.S. potential natural vegetation types, Point Pleasant Beach, New Jersey would have an Appalachian Oak (104) vegetation type with an Eastern Hardwood Forest (25) vegetation form.

Notable people

People who were born in, residents of, or otherwise closely associated with Point Pleasant Beach include:

 Evelyn Adams, two-time winner of the New Jersey Lottery 
 Jim Carone (born 1981), head coach of the Wagner Seahawks baseball team
 Robert (born 1966) and Dean DeLeo (born 1961), bass guitarist and guitarist respectively, from the musical rock group Stone Temple Pilots, grew up in Point Pleasant Beach
 Matt Farrell (born 1996), basketball player
 Katelynn Flaherty (born 1996), former basketball player for the Michigan Wolverines, who is the school's all-time leading scorer in points, man or woman, with 2,776 career points
 Alfred M. Gray Jr. (born 1928), 29th Commandant of the Marine Corps
 Dickie Harris (born 1950), all-star defensive back who played for the Montreal Alouettes of the Canadian Football League
 James W. Holzapfel (born 1944), member of the New Jersey Senate
 Leonard Lomell (1920–2011), U.S. Army Ranger who played a pivotal role in destroying German gun emplacements on D-Day

References

External links

 Point Pleasant Beach website
 Point Pleasant Beach School District
 
 School Data for the Point Pleasant Beach School District, National Center for Education Statistics
 Point Pleasant First Aid and Emergency Squad
 Ocean Fire Company #1
 Point Pleasant Beach Branch of Ocean County Library
 Point Pleasant Beach Chamber of Commerce website

 
1886 establishments in New Jersey
Borough form of New Jersey government
Boroughs in Ocean County, New Jersey
Jersey Shore communities in Ocean County
Populated places established in 1886